A county a geographical region of a country used for administrative or other purposes.

County may also refer to:
 County (United States), a level of local government below a U.S. state or federal territory 
 Counties of China, third level political subdivisions in the People's Republic of China
 County (Taiwan), an administrative division in the Republic of China (Taiwan)
Gaelic Athletic Association county, a division of the Gaelic Athletic Association
County (ward), an electoral division of Liverpool, England 
Slang for County jail
The County, a 2019 Icelandic film

Counties, in addition to being the plural for "county", may refer to:
 Counties Manukau Rugby Union, the governing body for rugby union in the Franklin District of New Zealand

See also